Jake Jon Taylor (born 8 September 1998) is an English professional footballer who plays as a midfielder for  club Morecambe.

He began his career at Nottingham Forest, though never made a first-team appearance for the club. He spent time on loan at Port Vale and Scunthorpe United, before joining Port Vale on a permanent transfer in January 2021. He helped the club to win promotion out of League Two via the play-offs in 2022. He was sold on to Morecambe in July 2022.

Career

Nottingham Forest
Taylor was a pupil at Moorside High School in Swinton, Greater Manchester and was associated with Manchester United as a schoolboy until he was not offered a scholarship at Old Trafford at the age of 16. In July 2015 he began a two-year apprenticeship at Nottingham Forest's youth-team. On 30 August 2019, he joined EFL League Two side Port Vale on loan after impressing manager John Askey in training games during a trial spell. Taylor said that "Port Vale have strong links with Forest, as you have seen with Adam Crookes and also Toby Edser came in. Phil Sproson is good friends with the academy manager Gary Brazil so the link is there. They have shown an interest and I have jumped at it." He made his debut the following day, coming on as a 67th-minute substitute for Cristian Montaño in a 1–0 win over Cambridge United at Vale Park. He later said that "I knew it would be physical but I think I have dealt with that quite well. Probably the speed of the game has surprised me." On 24 September, he scored his first goal in senior football in a 3–2 victory at Macclesfield Town in the EFL Trophy. He scored his first league goal four days later, bending the ball into the top corner from the edge of the penalty area in a 3–3 draw at Leyton Orient. On 2 November, he scored the only goal of the game at local rivals Crewe Alexandra. He picked up an injury early in January, but nevertheless had his loan spell extended until the end of the 2019–20 season. The loan deal was extended after Forest rebuffed two transfer bids from the Vale. However he was unable to add to his tally of seven goals in 25 appearances as the league was ended early due to the COVID-19 pandemic in England.

On 1 October 2020, Taylor joined League Two club Scunthorpe United on loan for the remainder of the 2020–21 season. Taylor was recalled from his loan at Glanford Park in January, having made 14 appearances for Neil Cox's "Iron".

Port Vale
On 11 January 2021, Taylor signed on a permanent deal with Port Vale on a three-and-a-half year deal. Rather than pay Nottingham Forest a transfer fee, the club agreed to a large sell-on clause. New manager Darrell Clarke dropped Taylor from the starting line-up after saying he needed to "add that bit of steel to his game", though added that "I see him having a bright future". He was sidelined with injury in early April, having scored once from 13 appearances for the club in the second half of the 2020–21 season. His agent, Phil Sproson, commented that "he has to have a good pre-season and then see what develops... he just needs to recapture the form he had when he first came on loan". He missed all of the pre-season and the start of the 2021–22 regular season with a thigh injury. He made 11 appearances before a reoccurrence of a quad injury saw ruled out of action "for a substantial time" in January. He returned to action on 15 April, earning praise from interim manager Andy Crosby for his performance after coming on as a 55th-minute substitute in a 1–0 win at Hartlepool United. He started in the play-off final at Wembley Stadium as Vale secured promotion with a 3–0 victory over Mansfield Town; Michael Baggaley of The Sentinel wrote that "[Taylor] used the ball well, spreading play with some pin-point crossfield passes".

Morecambe
He was reportedly a target of Morecambe in June 2022, with manager Derek Adams looking to sign him on a "bargain deal" to replace the departed Aaron Wildig. The transfer was confirmed on 8 July, with Morecambe paying an undisclosed fee and Taylor signing a two-year deal and stating that "I just wanted to go to a club where I felt wanted, play regularly and express myself". He missed two months of the season after picking up a muscle injury against Accrington Stanley at the start of October.

Style of play
Taylor describes himself as a "ball-playing midfielder", though can also play at left-back.

Career statistics

Honours
Port Vale
EFL League Two play-offs: 2022

References

1998 births
Living people
Footballers from Manchester
English footballers
Association football midfielders
Association football fullbacks
Manchester United F.C. players
Nottingham Forest F.C. players
Port Vale F.C. players
Scunthorpe United F.C. players
Morecambe F.C. players
English Football League players